James Mitchell Rogers House is a historic home located at Winston-Salem, Forsyth County, North Carolina.  It was built between 1883 and 1885, and is a large two-story, eclectic Late Victorian frame dwelling.  The house design reflects Late Gothic Revival, Italianate, and Queen Anne style design influences.  It features steeply pitched gables sheathed in board and batten siding, bay windows, and irregular massing.  It was the home of James Mitchell Rogers, a prominent Winston-Salem businessman, and his son, Francis Mitchell Rogers, chief chemist of Standard Oil Company of Indiana.

It was listed on the National Register of Historic Places in 1982.

References

Houses on the National Register of Historic Places in North Carolina
Italianate architecture in North Carolina
Gothic Revival architecture in North Carolina
Houses completed in 1885
Houses in Winston-Salem, North Carolina
National Register of Historic Places in Winston-Salem, North Carolina